Jabaquara may refer to:
 Subprefecture of Jabaquara, São Paulo
 Jabaquara (district of São Paulo)
 Jabaquara (São Paulo Metro)
 Jabaquara Intermunicipal Terminal, a bus terminal in São Paulo
 Jabaquara Atlético Clube, a football club based in Santos